Matthew Luksich (born 2 July 1996) is a South African cricketer. He made his List A debut for KwaZulu-Natal Inland in the 2016–17 CSA Provincial One-Day Challenge on 26 February 2017.

References

External links
 

1996 births
Living people
South African cricketers
KwaZulu-Natal Inland cricketers
Place of birth missing (living people)